Good Thing is a 1995 album by Rebecka Törnqvist.

Track listing
All song written by Rebecka Törnqvist and Pål Svenre except as noted.

"Good Thing" – 3:45
"Just as Long" – 4:39
"Sleep Tight" – 3:25
"Julio's Rainbow" (Rebecka Törnqvist, Esbjörn Svensson) – 4:37
"You and Your Great Love" – 4:09
"Forever More" – 4:35
"I Do" (Rebecka Törnqvist) – 4:31
"Monster Walk" – 5:10
"Love Song" – 3:04
"Larger Than Life" (Rebecka Törnqvist, Pål Svenre, Markus Wikström) – 5:34
"I Don't Know Why" (Shawn Colvin) – 5:28

Charts

References 

1995 albums
Rebecka Törnqvist albums